ThirdHome is a home exchange service focused on luxury homes. The company is based in Brentwood, Tennessee and operates worldwide.

Owners of luxury second homes apply online, and, if they meet requirements for location, characteristics of the house, and home value, become eligible as members. Each owner lists which weeks their house will be available. When someone is staying at their house, the owner receives fictional currency, usable to reserve weeks at any property available on the system, or for stays in affiliated clubs and resorts. The site charges a one-time enrollment fee and a variable fee per exchange Its "Reserve" program offers properties valued at $5 million or more. 

Homes are also available for rental by the general public for nightly fees.

History
ThirdHome was founded by real estate developer Wade Shealy in 2010 with an initial portfolio of 120 properties. 

In 4 years, it grew to 3,000 members in 73 countries.

By 2017, the site had about 8,000 properties.

In March 2017, inspired by The Best Job in the World, the company offered to hire someone to travel to luxury residences worldwide and share experiences online. 

Beginning May 2018, the company offered rental listings of homes valued at $500,000 and above to the general public.

Legal Issues
In 2016, ThirdHome was sued by Lightbox Ventures for breach of contract and breach of fiduciary duty for a failed joint venture with the company. Lightbox was awarded $100,000 by the courts for legal fees.

References

External links
 
Companies based in Tennessee
Real estate services companies of the United States
Hospitality companies of the United States
American companies established in 2010
Hospitality companies established in 2010
Real estate companies established in 2010
Vacation rental
2010 establishments in Tennessee
Hospitality services